Et l'amour crea la femme is a 1982 album by Julio Iglesias.

Track listing
"Don Quichotte" (4:02) (Gianni Belfiore, Julio Iglesias, Manuel de la Calva, Michel Jourdan, Pierre Carrel, Ramon Arcusa)
"Les Sourires de mes Souvenirs (Momentos)" (3:35) (Iglesias, Arcusa, Claude Lemesle, Tony Renis) 
"Amor, amor, amor" (3:22) (Gabriel Ruiz, Ricardo Lopez-Mendez, Carrel)
"D'abord et Puis" (4:15) (Demetrio Ortiz, Zulema de Mirkin, Carrel)
"C'est Bon Tout ça" (3:31) (Carrel, Jourdan, Jeri Sullivan, Morey Amsterdam, Paul Baron)
"Et l'Amour Créa la Femme (Si el Amor Llama a Tu Puerta)" (3:37) (Jourdan, Carrel, Ray Girado)
"Nostalgie (Nathalie)" (3:56) (Lemesle, Iglesias, Arcusa)
"L'amour Fragile" (3:24) (Carrel, Girado)
"Ne Me Parle Plus d'Amour (No Me Vuelvo a Enamorar)" (3:49) (Lemesle, Iglesias, Arcusa, Fernan Martinez)
"Oh! La La Amour" (3:43) (Carrel, Jorge "Ketepao" Macias)

Certifications and sales

References

1982 albums
Julio Iglesias albums
Spanish-language albums